Osipovo is a rural locality (a village) in Dvinitskoye Rural Settlement, Sokolsky District, Vologda Oblast, Russia. The population was 14 as of 2002.

Geography 
The distance to Sokol is 39 km, to Chekshino is 1 km.

References 

Rural localities in Sokolsky District, Vologda Oblast